The Richard Nixon Birthplace is the birthplace and early childhood home of Richard Nixon, the 37th president of the United States.  It is located on the grounds of the Richard Nixon Presidential Library and Museum at 18001 Yorba Linda Boulevard in Yorba Linda, California, and serves as a historic house museum.

The house was built in 1912 on family ranchland; Nixon was born there the following year. He and his family stayed there until 1922, when they moved to Whittier, California. The former home was designated a National Historic Landmark in 1973, and a California Historical Landmark in 1994.

Description and history
The Richard Nixon Presidential Library and Museum is located on the north side of Yorba Linda Boulevard at its junction with Eureka Avenue, west of downtown Yorba Linda.  The property is dominated by the museum complex and parking lot; the Birthplace is located in a slightly secluded setting east of the main building, in a grove of trees.  It is a  story Craftsman-style bungalow, with a gabled roof and clapboarded exterior.  The north roof face has a broad shed-roof dormer projecting, and a gabled hood shelters the main entrance.  Some of its windows feature diamond-pane sashes or panels.

The house was built in 1912 from a mail-order construction kit by Francis A. Nixon, on ranchland owned by the family.  Richard Nixon was born in this house the following year, and the family remained here until 1922, when they moved to Whittier.  Francis Nixon sold off portions of the  property in 1922 and 1925, with the largest part going to the Yorba Linda School District for the construction of a school.  The district purchased the rest of the tract in 1948, using the house as employee housing.

Nixon formed a nonprofit library organization in 1968, after winning his first election as president.  The school district deeded the property over to that organization in 1988.  The school was torn down, and the museum established on the premises.

See also
List of National Historic Landmarks in California
National Register of Historic Places listings in Orange County, California
Presidential memorials in the United States

References

External links
Richard Nixon Presidential Library and Museum: Richard Nixon Birthplace
National Park Service: The Nixon Birthplace
Richard Nixon Foundation
Sears-homes: "The Unknown Origin of Richard Nixon's Mail-Order House."

 Huell Howser. "Nixon Boyhood Home". California's Gold.

Houses in Orange County, California
Birthplace
Historic house museums in California
Biographical museums in California
Museums in Orange County, California
Presidential homes in the United States
Yorba Linda, California
Birthplaces of individual people
California Historical Landmarks
Houses on the National Register of Historic Places in California
National Historic Landmarks in California
National Register of Historic Places in Orange County, California
Houses completed in 1912
1912 establishments in California
Relocated buildings and structures in California
Bungalow architecture in California
Kit houses